Return to Macon County is a 1975 American action drama film and a sequel to the 1974 drive-in classic Macon County Line. This film was written and directed by Richard Compton, who was also responsible for the earlier film. It was re-released by Orion Pictures in the late-1990s.

Set in 1958, the film stars then little-known actors Nick Nolte (as Bo) and Don Johnson (as Harley). They portray friends who are heading to California to enter a drag race.

Plot summary
Bo (Nick Nolte) is the driver and Harley (Don Johnson) is the mechanic. They stop at a roadside diner to eat and meet Junell (Robin Mattson). Junell, while attractive, is in a world of her own. After having an altercation with a customer, she is rescued by Bo and Harley.

The hot-rodding friends find that Junell (with suitcase in hand) wants to travel with them. Their adventure on the road with Junell turns dangerous after a misunderstanding at a grocery store, where Junell is trying to raise funds for Bo and Harley's entrance fee to the drag race. Sgt. Wittaker (Robert Viharo) becomes obsessed with catching them, which leads to tragic results.

See also
 List of American films of 1975

External links

1975 films
1975 action films
1970s action drama films
American auto racing films
American action drama films
American International Pictures films
American sequel films
American chase films
Films set in 1958
Films scored by Robert O. Ragland
Films set in Georgia (U.S. state)
Films shot in Georgia (U.S. state)
1975 drama films
Films directed by Richard Compton
1970s English-language films
1970s American films